Edward J. Hughes (October 5, 1880 – October 14, 1927) was an American Major League Baseball player for the Chicago White Sox (1902) and Boston Red Sox (1905–06). Hughes batted and threw right-handed. He was born in Chicago.

Hughes started his majors career as a catcher with the Chicago National League team. Converted to a pitcher, he jumped to the American League with Boston. He was the first player to ever be on both Sox teams.

As a pitcher, Hughes posted a 3–2 record with 12 strikeouts and a 4.78 ERA in 43 and a third innings pitched, including two complete games. He was a .190 hitter (4-for-21) with two runs and two RBI in nine games played.

Hughes died in McHenry, Illinois at age 47.

Fact
His older brother, Long Tom Hughes, also pitched for Chicago (NL) and Boston (AL). They were the first set of brothers to play for the Red Sox.

External links
Retrosheet
Baseball Reference

Boston Americans players
Chicago White Sox players
Major League Baseball catchers
Major League Baseball pitchers
1880 births
1927 deaths
Baseball players from Chicago